The Oakland Athletics' 2010 season was their 42nd in Oakland, California. It was also the 110th season in franchise history. The team finished second in the American League West with a record of 81-81.

The Athletics' 2010 season is remembered mainly for Dallas Braden's perfect game. Braden accomplished the feat on May 9, 2010, against the visiting Tampa Bay Rays. The Rays had the league's best record at the time.

The season also saw Oakland's starting rotation improve greatly. The Athletics, led by a trio of promising young starters (Gio González, Trevor Cahill, and Brett Anderson), ultimately posted the American League's lowest earned run average in 2010. All told, the team allowed some 135 fewer runs than it did in 2009. Cahill, along with closer Andrew Bailey, would be rewarded for their strong performance with All-Star selections.

The 2010 season was the only non-losing season of manager Bob Geren's tenure. Geren would ultimately be fired midway through the Athletics' 2011 season.

Regular season

Season standings

Game log 

|- style="text-align:center; background:#fbb;"
| 1 || April 5 || Mariners || 3–5 || League (1–0) || Ziegler (0–1) || Aardsma (1) || 30,686 || 1–0 || 
|- style="text-align:center; background:#bfb;"
| 2 || April 6 || Mariners || 2–1 || Ramírez (1–0) || Texeira (0–1) || || 10,090 || 1–1 || 
|- style="text-align:center; background:#bfb;"
| 3 || April 7 || Mariners || 6–5 || Blevins (1–0) || Lowe (0–1) || || 18,194 || 2–1 ||
|- style="text-align:center; background:#bfb;"
| 4 || April 8 || Mariners || 6–2 || Anderson (1–0) || Fister (0–1) || || 12,464 || 3–1 || 
|- style="text-align:center; background:#bfb;"
| 5 || April 9 || @ Angels || 4–10 || Gonzalez (1–0) || Palmer (0–1) || || 40,034 || 4–1 || 
|- style="text-align:center; background:#fbb;"
| 6 || April 10 || @ Angels || 3–4 || Rodney (1–0) || Breslow (0–1) || || 40,249 || 4–2 || 
|- style="text-align:center; background:#bfb;"
| 7 || April 11 || @ Angels || 9–4 || Braden (1–0) ||Saunders (0–2) || Ross (1) || 40,601 || 5–2 || 
|- style="text-align:center; background:#bfb;"
| 8 || April 12 || @ Mariners || 4–0 || Duchscherer (1–0) || Rowland-Smith (0–1) || || 45,876 || 6–2 || 
|- style="text-align:center; background:#fbb;"
| 9 || April 13 || @ Mariners || 0–3 || Fister (1–1) || Ziegler (0–2) || Aardsma (3) || 18,043 || 6–3 || 
|- style="text-align:center; background:#fbb;"
| 10 || April 14 || @ Mariners || 2–4 || Vargas (1–1) || Gaudin (0–1) || Aardsma (4) || 19,978 || 6–4 || 
|- style="text-align:center; background:#bfb;"
| 11 || April 15 || Orioles || 6–2 || Sheets (1–0) || Hernandez (0–2) || || 17,382 || 7–4 || 
|- style="text-align:center; background:#bfb;"
| 12 || April 16 || Orioles || 4–2 || Braden (2–0) || Millwood (0–2) || Bailey (1) || 12,225 || 8–4 || 
|- style="text-align:center; background:#bfb;"
| 13 || April 17 || Orioles ||4–3 || Blevins (2–0) || Johnson (0–1) || || 15,072 || 9–4 || 
|- style="text-align:center; background:#fbb;"
| 14 || April 18 || Orioles || 3–8 || Matusz (2–0) || Anderson (1–1) || Johnson (1) || 14,451 || 9–5 ||
|- style="text-align:center; background:#fbb;"
| 15 || April 20 || Yankees || 3–7 || Vázquez (1–2) || Gonzalez (1–1) || || 19,849 || 9–6 || 
|- style="text-align:center; background:#fbb;"
| 16 || April 21 || Yankees || 1–3 || Hughes (2–0) || Sheets (1–1) || Rivera (6) || 30,211 || 9–7 || 
|- style="text-align:center; background:#bfb;"
| 17 || April 22 || Yankees || 4–2 || Braden (3–0) || Sabathia (2–1) || Bailey (2) || 21,986 || 10–7 || 
|- style="text-align:center; background:#bfb;"
| 18 || April 23 || Indians || 10–0 || Duchscherer (2–0) || Westbrook || || 11,547 || 11–7 || 
|- style="text-align:center; background:#fbb;"
| 19 || April 24 || Indians || 1–6 || Carmona (3–0) || Gaudin (0–2) || || 15,873 || 11–8 || 
|- style="text-align:center; background:#bfb;"
| 20 || April 25 || Indians || 11–0 || Gonzalez (2–1) || Masterson (0–3) || || 16,946 || 12–8 || 
|- style="text-align:center; background:#fbb;"
| 21 || April 27 || @ Rays || 6–8 || Davis (2–1) || Sheets (1–2) || Soriano (5) || 10,825 || 12–9 || 
|- style="text-align:center; background:#fbb;"
| 22 || April 28 || @ Rays || 3–10 || Shields (3–0) || Braden (3–1) || || 10,691 || 12–10 || 
|- style="text-align:center; background:#fbb;"
| 23 || April 29 || @ Blue Jays || 3–6 || Romero (2–1) || Duchscherer (2–1) || Gregg (6) || 10,721 || 12–11 || 
|- style="text-align:center; background:#fbb;"
| 24 || April 30 || @ Blue Jays || 2–10 || Morrow (2–2) || Cahill (0–1) || || 12,722 ||12–12 || 
|-

|- style="text-align:center; background:#bfb;"
| 25 || May 1 || @ Blue Jays || 4–3 || Gonzalez (3–1) || Eveland (2–1) || Bailey (3) || 13,951 || 13–12 || 
|- style="text-align:center; background:#fbb;"
| 26 || May 2 || @ Blue Jays || 3–9 || Marcum (1–1) || Sheets (1–3) || || 14,725 || 13–13 || 
|- style="text-align:center; background:#fbb;"
| 27 || May 3 || Rangers || 2–4 || Harden (2–1) || Braden (3–2) || Feliz (6) || 8,874 || 13–14 ||
|- style="text-align:center; background:#bfb;"
| 28 || May 4 || Rangers || 7–6 || Ziegler (1–2) || Feldman (1–3) || Bailey (4) || 10,135 || 14–14 || 
|- style="text-align:center; background:#bfb;"
| 29 || May 5 || Rangers || 4–1 || Cahill (1–1) || Lewis (3–1) || Bailey (5) || 15,403 || 15–14 || 
|- style="text-align:center; background:#fbb;"
| 30 || May 7 || Rays || 1–4 || Price (4–1) || Gonzalez (3–2) || Soriano (8) || 19,193 || 15–15 || 
|- style="text-align:center; background:#bfb;"
| 31 || May 8 || Rays || 4–2 || Sheets (2–3) || Davis (3–2) || Bailey (6) || 15,493 || 16–15 || 
|- style="text-align:center; background:#bfb;"
| 32 || May 9 || Rays || 4–0 || Braden (4–2) || Shields (4–1) || || 12,228 || 17–15 || 
|- style="text-align:center; background:#bfb;"
| 33 || May 11 || @ Rangers || 7–6 || Ross (1–0) || Nippert (1–3) || || 15,474 || 18–15 || 
|- style="text-align:center; background:#fbb;"
| 34 || May 12 || @ Rangers || 1–10 || Holland (1–0) || Gonzalez (3–3) || || 26,625 || 18–16 || 
|- style="text-align:center; background:#fbb;"
| 35 || May 13 || @ Rangers || 1–2 || Nippert (2–3) || Bailey (0–1) || ||27,507 || 18–17 || 
|- style="text-align:center; background:#fbb;"
| 36 || May 14 || @ Angels || 0–4 || Saunders (2–5) || Braden (4–3) || || 41,290 || 18–18 || 
|- style="text-align:center; background:#fbb;"
| 37 || May 15 || @ Angels || 3–12 || Santana (2–3) || Ross (1–1) || || 41,744 || 18–19 || 
|- style="text-align:center; background:#fbb;"
| 38 || May 16 || @ Angels || 0–4 || Piñeiro (3–4) || Cahill (1–2) || || 41,569 || 18–20 || 
|- style="text-align:center; background:#bfb;"
| 39 || May 17 || Mariners || 8–4 || Gonzalez (4–3) || Rowland-Smith (0–4) || || 10,051 || 19–20 || 
|- style="text-align:center; background:#bfb;"
| 40 || May 18 || Mariners || 6–5 || Breslow (1–1) || League (3–4) || || 10,512 || 20–20 || 
|- style="text-align:center; background:#fbb;"
| 41 || May 19 || Tigers || 1–5 || Verlander (5–2) || Braden (4–4) || || 19,284 || 20–21 || 
|- style="text-align:center; background:#fbb;"
| 42 || May 20 || Tigers || 2–5 || Bonderman (2–2) || Ross (1–2) || Valverde (11) || 24,146 || 20–22 || 
|- style="text-align:center; background:#bfb;"
| 43 || May 21 || Giants || 6–1 || Cahill (2–2) || Zito (6–2) || || 33,369 || 21–22 || 
|- style="text-align:center; background:#bfb;"
| 44 || May 22 || Giants || 1–0 || Gonzalez (5–3) || Cain (2–4) || Bailey (7) || 35,067 || 22–22 || 
|- style="text-align:center; background:#bfb;"
| 45 || May 23 || Giants || 3–0 || Wuertz (1–0) || Sánchez (2–4) || Bailey (8) || 35,067 || 23–22 || 
|- style="text-align:center; background:#fbb;"
| 46 || May 25 || @ Orioles || 1–5 || Guthrie (3–4) || Ross (1–3) || || 14,686 || 23–23 || 
|- style="text-align:center; background:#bfb;"
| 47 || May 26 || @ Orioles || 6–1 || Cahill (3–2) || Matusz (2–5) || || 19,153 || 24–23 || 
|- style="text-align:center; background:#bfb;"
| 48 || May 27 || @ Orioles || 7–5 || Wuertz (2–0) || Hendrickson (1–3) || Bailey (9) || 26,279 || 25–23 || 
|- style="text-align:center; background:#bfb;"
| 49 || May 28 || @ Tigers || 5–4 || Ziegler (2–2) || Perry (1–4) || Bailey (10) || 40,210 || 26–23 || 
|- style="text-align:center; background:#bfb;"
| 50 || May 29 || @ Tigers || 6–0 || Anderson (2–1) || Porcello (4–5) || || 39,750 || 27–23 || 
|- style="text-align:center; background:#fbb;"
| 51 || May 30 || @ Tigers || 2–10 || Scherzer (2–4) || Braden (4–5) || || 32,510 || 27–24 || 
|- style="text-align:center; background:#bfb;"
| 52 || May 31 || @ Tigers || 4–1 || Cahill (4–2) || Verlander (5–4) || Bailey (11) || 23,641 || 28–24 || 
|-

|- style="text-align:center; background:#fbb;"
| 53 || June 1 || @ Red Sox || 4–9 || Lackey (6–3) || Ross (1–4) || || 37,337 || 28–25 || 
|- style="text-align:center; background:#fbb;"
| 54 || June 2 || @ Red Sox || 4–6 || Matsuzaka (4–2) || Sheets (2–4) || Papelbon (13) || 37,783 || 28–26 || 
|- style="text-align:center; background:#bfb;"
| 55 || June 3 || @ Red Sox || 9–8 || Mazzaro (1–0) || Wakefield (1–4) || Bailey (12) || 37,386 || 29–26 || 
|- style="text-align:center; background:#fbb;"
| 56 || June 4 || Twins || 4–5 (11) || Guerrier (1–1) || Bailey (0–2) || Rauch (14) || 21,703 || 29–27 || 
|- style="text-align:center; background:#fbb;"
| 57 || June 5 || Twins || 3–4 || Burnett (1–1) || Ziegler (2–3) || Rauch (15) || 16,421 || 29–28 || 
|- style="text-align:center; background:#bfb;"
| 58 || June 6 || Twins || 5–4 || Gonzalez (6–3) || Blackburn (6–3) || Wuertz (1) || 20,059 || 30–28 || 
|- style="text-align:center; background:#fbb;"
| 59 || June 7 || Angels || 2–4 || Kazmir (5–5) || Sheets (2–5) || Fuentes (8) || 10,071 || 30–29 || 
|- style="text-align:center; background:#bfb;"
| 60 || June 8 || Angels || 10–1 || Mazzaro (2–0) || Weaver (5–3) || || 11,860 || 31–29 || 
|- style="text-align:center; background:#fbb;"
| 61 || June 9 || Angels || 1–7 || Saunders (5–6) || Braden (4–6) || || 18,285 || 31–30 || 
|- style="text-align:center; background:#bfb;"
| 62 || June 10 || Angels || 6–1 || Cahill (5–2) || Santana (6–4) || || 12,328 || 32–30 || 
|- style="text-align:center; background:#fbb;"
| 63 || June 11 || @ Giants || 2–6 || Lincecum (6–2) || Gonzalez (6–4) || Wilson (16) || 41,817 || 32–31 || 
|- style="text-align:center; background:#fbb;"
| 64 || June 12 || @ Giants || 4–5 || Zito (7–2) || Sheets (2–6) || Wilson (17) || 36,861 || 32–32 || 
|- style="text-align:center; background:#fbb;"
| 65 || June 13 || @ Giants || 2–6 || Cain (6–4) || Mazzaro (2–1) || Casilla (2) || 39,187 || 32–33 || 
|- style="text-align:center; background:#bfb;"
| 66 || June 15 || @ Cubs || 9–5 || Cahill (6–2) || Zambrano (2–5) || || 34,390 || 33–33 || 
|- style="text-align:center; background:#fbb;"
| 67 || June 16 || @ Cubs || 2–6 || Dempster (5–5) || Gonzalez (6–5) || || 36,244 || 33–34 || 
|- style="text-align:center; background:#fbb;"
| 68 || June 17 || @ Cubs || 2–3 || Mármol (2–1) || Blevins (2–1) || || 36,942 || 33–35 || 
|- style="text-align:center; background:#fbb;"
| 69 || June 18 || @ Cardinals || 4–6 || Carpenter (8–1) || Ziegler (2–4) || Franklin (13) || 40,083 || 33–36 || 
|- style="text-align:center; background:#fbb;"
| 70 || June 19 || @ Cardinals || 3–4 || Wainwright (10–4) || Sheets (2–7) || Motte (2) || 43,682 || 33–37 || 
|- style="text-align:center; background:#bfb;"
| 71 || June 20 || @ Cardinals || 3–2 || Breslow (2–1) || Hawksworth (1–4) || Bailey (13) || 42,271 || 34–37 || 
|- style="text-align:center; background:#fbb;"
| 72 || June 21 || Reds || 4–6 || Cordero (3–3) || Wuertz (2–1) || Smith (1) || 11,088 || 34–38 || 
|- style="text-align:center; background:#fbb;"
| 73 || June 22 || Reds || 2–4 || Arroyo (7–3) || Braden (4–7) || Cordero (18) || 12,136 || 34–39 || 
|- style="text-align:center; background:#fbb;"
| 74 || June 23 || Reds || 0–3 || Cueto (7–2) || Mazzaro (2–2) || Cordero (19) || 20,824 || 34–40 || 
|- style="text-align:center; background:#bfb;"
| 75 || June 25 || Pirates || 14–4 || Sheets (3–7) || Lincoln (0–2) || || 11,154 || 35–40 || 
|- style="text-align:center; background:#bfb;"
| 76 || June 26 || Pirates || 5–0 || Cahill (7–2) || McCutchen (0–3) || || 25,068 || 36–40 || 
|- style="text-align:center; background:#bfb;"
| 77 || June 27 || Pirates || 3–2 || Breslow (3–1) || Meek (3–2) || Bailey (14) || 15,238 || 37–40 || 
|- style="text-align:center; background:#bfb;"
| 78 || June 29 || @ Orioles || 4–2 || Mazzaro (3–2) || Matusz (2–9) || Bailey (15) || 11,987 || 38–40 || 
|- style="text-align:center; background:#fbb;"
| 79 || June 30 || @ Orioles || 6–9 || Albers (3–3) || Bowers (0–1) || Simón (10) || 21,392 || 38–41 || 
|-

|- style="text-align:center; background:#bfb;"
| 80 || July 1 || @ Orioles || 8–1 || Cahill (8–2) || Arrieta (2–2) || || 15,712 || 39–41 || 
|- style="text-align:center; background:#bfb;"
| 81 || July 2 || @ Indians || 3–0 || Gonzalez (7–5) || Talbot (8–7) || Bailey (16) || 18,629 || 40–41 || 
|- style="text-align:center; background:#fbb;"
| 82 || July 3 || @ Indians || 4–5 (10) || Sipp (1–2) || Breslow (3–2) || || 25,483 || 40–42 || 
|- style="text-align:center; background:#bfb;"
| 83 || July 4 || @ Indians || 3–1 || Mazzaro (4–2) || Carmona (7–7) || Bailey (17) || 13,940 || 41–42 || 
|- style="text-align:center; background:#fbb;"
| 84 || July 5 || Yankees || 1–3 || Vázquez (7–7) || Sheets (3–8) || Rivera (19) || 27,405 || 41–43 || 
|- style="text-align:center; background:#fbb;"
| 85 || July 6 || Yankees || 1–6 || Sabathia (11–3) || Cahill (8–3) || || 20,473 || 41–44 || 
|- style="text-align:center; background:#fbb;"
| 86 || July 7 || Yankees || 2–6 || Burnett (7–7) || Gonzalez (7–6) || || 31,518 || 41–45 || 
|- style="text-align:center; background:#fbb;"
| 87 || July 9 || Angels || 5–6 || Jepsen (1–1) || Bailey (0–3) || Fuentes (16) || 13,156 || 41–46 || 
|- style="text-align:center; background:#bfb;"
| 88 || July 10 || Angels || 15–1 || Sheets (4–8) || Kazmir (7–9) || || 30,035 || 42–46 || 
|- style="text-align:center; background:#bfb;"
| 89 || July 11 || Angels || 5–2 || Cahill (9–3) || Weaver (8–5) || Bailey (18) || 15,164 || 43–46 || 
|- style="text-align:center; background:#bfb;"
| 90 || July 16 || @ Royals || 5–1 || Gonzalez (8–6) || Greinke (5–9) || || 37,312 || 44–46 || 
|- style="text-align:center; background:#bfb;"
| 91 || July 17 || @ Royals || 6–5 || Breslow (4–2) || Soria (0–2) || Bailey (19) || 26,634 || 45–46 || 
|- style="text-align:center; background:#bfb;"
| 92 || July 18 || @ Royals || 9–6 || Mazzaro (5–2) || Bannister (7–8) || Bailey (20) || 18,702 || 46–46 || 
|- style="text-align:center; background:#fbb;"
| 93 || July 19 || Red Sox || 1–2 || Matzusaka (7–3) || Sheets (4–9) || Papelbon (21) || 19,341 || 46–47 || 
|- style="text-align:center; background:#bfb;"
| 94 || July 20 || Red Sox || 5–4 (10) || Bailey (1–3) || Ramírez (0–3) || || 20,271 || 47–47 || 
|- style="text-align:center; background:#bfb;"
| 95 || July 21 || Red Sox || 6–4 || Gonzalez (9–6) || Buchholz (10–5) || Wuertz (2) || 30,456 || 48–47 || 
|- style="text-align:center; background:#fbb;"
| 96 || July 23 || White Sox || 1–5 || Buehrle (9–8) || Cahill (9–4) || || 15,103 || 48–48 || 
|- style="text-align:center; background:#bfb;"
| 97 || July 24 || White Sox || 10–2 || Mazzaro (6–2) || García (9–4) || || 17,439 || 49–48 || 
|- style="text-align:center; background:#bfb;"
| 98 || July 25 || White Sox || 6–4 || Braden (5–7) || Hudson (1–1) || Wuertz (3) || 17,148 || 50–48 || 
|- style="text-align:center; background:#fbb;"
| 99 || July 27 || @ Rangers || 1–3 || Feliz (2–2) || Wuertz (2–2) || || 28,124 || 50–49 || 
|- style="text-align:center; background:#bfb;"
| 100 || July 28 || @ Rangers || 1–3 || Cahill (10–4) || Lewis (9–7) || Breslow (1) || 38,269 || 51–49 || 
|- style="text-align:center; background:#fbb;"
| 101 || July 29 || @ Rangers || 4–7 || Wilson (10–5) || Mazzaro (6–3) || || 28.739 || 51–50 || 
|- style="text-align:center; background:#fbb;"
| 102 || July 30 || @ White Sox || 1–6 || Harrell (1–0) || Anderson (2–2) || || 29,431 || 51–51 || 
|- style="text-align:center; background:#bfb;"
| 103 || July 31 || @ White Sox || 6–2 || Braden (6–7) || Danks (11–8) || || 35,852 || 52–51 || 
|-

|- style="text-align:center; background:#fbb;"
| 104 || August 1 || @ White Sox || 1–4 || Floyd (7–8) || Gonzalez (9–7) || Jenks (22) || 32,118 || 52–52 || 
|- style="text-align:center; background:#bfb;"
| 105 || August 2 || Royals || 6–0 || Cahill (11–4) || Bannister (7–11) || || 10,047 || 53–52 || 
|- style="text-align:center; background:#fbb;"
| 106 || August 3 || Royals || 2–3 || Chavez (4–2) || Breslow (4–3) || Soria (30) || 10,670 || 53–53 || 
|- style="text-align:center; background:#bfb;"
| 107 || August 4 || Royals || 4–3 || Anderson (3–2) || O'Sullivan (1–2) || Wuertz (4) || 22,325 || 54–53 || 
|- style="text-align:center; background:#fbb;"
| 108 || August 6 || Rangers || 1–5 || Lee (10–5) || Braden (6–8) || || 26,388 || 54–54 || 
|- style="text-align:center; background:#bfb;"
| 109 || August 7 || Rangers || 6–2 || Gonzalez (10–7) || Harden (4–4) || || 16,104 || 55–54 || 
|- style="text-align:center; background:#bfb;"
| 110 || August 8 || Rangers || 3–2 || Cahill (12–4) || Oliver (0–1) || Wuertz (5) || 18,050 || 56–54 || 
|- style="text-align:center; background:#fbb;"
| 111 || August 9 || @ Mariners || 1–5 || Fister (4–8) || Mazzaro (6–4) || Aardsma (21) || 19,943 || 56–55 || 
|- style="text-align:center; background:#fbb;"
| 112 || August 10 || @ Mariners || 0–2 || Hernández (8–9) || Anderson (3–3) || Aardsma (22) || 21,377 || 56–56 || 
|- style="text-align:center; background:#bfb;"
| 113 || August 11 || @ Mariners || 5–1 || Braden (7–8) || French (1–3) || || 31,560 || 57–56 || 
|- style="text-align:center; background:#fbb;"
| 114 || August 13 || @ Twins || 3–4 || Pavano (15–7) || Gonzalez (10–8) || Capps (29) || 40,622 || 57–57 || 
|- style="text-align:center; background:#fbb;"
| 115 || August 14 || @ Twins || 0–2 || Duensing (6–1) || Cahill (12–5) || || 40,830 || 57–58 || 
|- style="text-align:center; background:#fbb;"
| 116 || August 15 || @ Twins || 2–4 || Slowey (11–5) || Mazzaro (6–5) || Capps (30) || 40,602 || 57–59 || 
|- style="text-align:center; background:#fbb;"
| 117 || August 16 || Blue Jays || 1–3 || Marcum (11–6) || Anderson (3–4) || || 10,136 || 57–60 || 
|- style="text-align:center; background:#bfb;"
| 118 || August 17 || Blue Jays || 6–2 || Braden (8–8) || Tallet (2–5) || Wuertz (6) || 13,237 || 58–60 || 
|- style="text-align:center; background:#bfb;"
| 119 || August 18 || Blue Jays || 5–4 || Ziegler (3–4) || Janssen (4–1) || || 18,046 || 59–60 || 
|- style="text-align:center; background:#bfb;"
| 120 || August 19 || Rays || 4–3 || Cahill (13–5) || Wheeler (2–1) || Blevins (1) || 10,118 || 60–60 || 
|- style="text-align:center; background:#bfb;"
| 121 || August 20 || Rays || 5–4 || Rodríguez (1–0) || Benoit (0–2) || Breslow (2) || 13,207 || 61–60 || 
|- style="text-align:center; background:#fbb;"
| 122 || August 21 || Rays || 4–5 || Choate (3–3) || Breslow (4–4) || Soriano (36) || 16,202 || 61–61 || 
|- style="text-align:center; background:#fbb;"
| 123 || August 22 || Rays || 2–3 || Garza (13–7) || Braden (8–9) || Soriano (37) || 18,749 || 61–62 || 
|- style="text-align:center; background:#bfb;"
| 124 || August 24 || @ Indians || 5–0 || Gonzalez (11–8) || Carmona (11–12) || || 11,751 || 62–62 || 
|- style="text-align:center; background:#bfb;"
| 125 || August 25 || @ Indians || 6–1 || Cahill (14–5) || Talbot (8–11) || || 10,514 || 63–62 || 
|- style="text-align:center; background:#fbb;"
| 126 || August 26 || @ Indians || 2–3 || Masterson (5–12) || Mazzaro (6–6) || Perez (16) || 11,826 || 63–63 || 
|- style="text-align:center; background:#fbb;"
| 127 || August 27 || @ Rangers || 3–7 || Hunter (11–2) || Anderson (3–5) || || 24,962 || 63–64 || 
|- style="text-align:center; background:#bfb;"
| 128 || August 28 || @ Rangers || 5–0 || Braden (9–9) || Harden (5–5) || || 47,411 || 64–64 || 
|- style="text-align:center; background:#bfb;"
| 129 || August 29 || @ Rangers || 8–2 || Gonzalez (12–8) || Lewis (9–11) || || 37,188 || 65–64 || 
|- style="text-align:center; background:#fbb;"
| 130 || August 30 || @ Yankees || 5–11 || Vázquez (10–9) || Cahill (14–6) || || 46,356 || 65–65 || 
|- style="text-align:center; background:#fbb;"
| 131 || August 31 || @ Yankees || 3–9 || Hughes (16–6) || Mazzaro (6–7) || || 44,575 || 65–66 || 
|-

|- style="text-align:center; background:#fbb;"
| 132 || September 1 || @ Yankees || 3–4 || Burnett (10–12) || Anderson (3–6) || Rivera (28) || 45,222 || 65–67 || 
|- style="text-align:center; background:#fbb;"
| 133 || September 2 || @ Yankees || 0–5 || Sabathia (19–5) || Braden (9–10) || || 44,644 || 65–68 || 
|- style="text-align:center; background:#bfb;"
| 134 || September 3 || Angels || 8–0 || Gonzalez (13–8) || Kazmir (8–13) || || 23,401 || 66–68 || 
|- style="text-align:center; background:#bfb;"
| 135 || September 4 || Angels || 3–1 || Cahill (15–6) || Weaver (11–11) || Bailey (21) || 14,227 || 67–68 || 
|- style="text-align:center; background:#fbb;"
| 136 || September 5 || Angels || 4–7 || Santana (15–9) || Mazzaro (6–8) || || 16,413 || 67–69 || 
|- style="text-align:center; background:#bfb;"
| 137 || September 6 || Mariners || 6–2 || Anderson (4–6) || Vargas (9–9) || || 11,581 || 68–69 || 
|- style="text-align:center; background:#fbb;"
| 138 || September 7 || Mariners || 5–7 || Fister (5–11) || Braden (9–11) || Aardsma (29) || 10,067 || 68–70 || 
|- style="text-align:center; background:#bfb;"
| 139 || September 8 || Mariners || 4–3 || Gonzalez (14–8) || French (4–5) || Bailey (22) || 15,180 || 69–70 || 
|- style="text-align:center; background:#bfb;"
| 140 || September 10 || Red Sox || 5–0 || Cahill (16–6) || Buchhloz (15–7) || || 19,139 || 70–70 || 
|- style="text-align:center; background:#bfb;"
| 141 || September 11 || Red Sox || 4–3 || Anderson (5–6) ||Lackey (12–10) || Bailey (23) || 22,932 || 71–70 || 
|- style="text-align:center; background:#fbb;"
| 142 || September 12 || Red Sox || 3–5 || Beckett (5–4) || Braden (9–12) || Papelbon (36) || 19,806 || 71–71 || 
|- style="text-align:center; background:#bfb;"
| 143 || September 13 || @ Royals || 3–1 || Cramer (1–0) || Hochevar (5–5) || Bailey (24) || 20,695 || 72–71 || 
|- style="text-align:center; background:#fbb;"
| 144 || September 14 || @ Royals || 3–11 || Greinke (9–12) || Gonzalez (14–9) || || 12,852 || 72–72 || 
|- style="text-align:center; background:#fbb;"
| 145 || September 15 || @ Royals || 3–6 || Chen (10–7) || Cahill (16–7) || Soria (38) || 11,087 || 72–73 || 
|- style="text-align:center; background:#bfb;"
| 146 || September 17 || @ Twins || 3–1 || Anderson (6–6) || Blackburn (9–10) || Bailey (25) || 40,681 || 73–73 || 
|- style="text-align:center; background:#fbb;"
| 147 || September 18 || @ Twins || 2–4 || Slowey (13–6) || Braden (9–13) || Capps (40) || 40,847 || 73–74 || 
|- style="text-align:center; background:#bfb;"
| 148 || September 19 || @ Twins || 6–2 || Cramer (2–0) || Liriano (14–8) || || 40,088 || 74–74 || 
|- style="text-align:center; background:#bfb;"
| 149 || September 20 || White Sox || 3–0 || Bonser (1–0) || Linebrink (3–2) || Breslow (3) || 10,090 || 75–74 || 
|- style="text-align:center; background:#bfb;"
| 150 || September 21 || White Sox || 7–2 || Cahill (17–7) || Buehrle (12–12) || || 11,158 || 76–74 || 
|- style="text-align:center; background:#fbb;"
| 151 || September 22 || White Sox || 3–4 || Thornton (4–4) || Zielger (3–5) || Sale (3) || 16,056 || 76–75 || 
|- style="text-align:center; background:#bfb;"
| 152 || September 23 || Rangers || 5–0 || Braden (10–13) || Lee (12–9) || || 10,815 || 77–75 || 
|- style="text-align:center; background:#fbb;"
| 153 || September 24 || Rangers || 3–10 || Hunter (13–4) || Cramer (2–1) || || 15,539 || 77–76 || 
|- style="text-align:center; background:#fbb;"
| 154 || September 25 || Rangers || 3–4 || O'Day (5–2) || Wuertz (2–3) || Feliz (38) || 20,136 || 77–77 || 
|- style="text-align:center; background:#fbb;"
| 155 || September 26 || Rangers || 9–16 || Lewis (12–13) || Cahill (17–8) || || 21,030 || 77–78 || 
|- style="text-align:center; background:#fbb;"
| 156 || September 27 || @ Angels || 5–6 || Kohn (2–0) || Ziegler (3–6) || Rodney (13) || 40,414 || 77–79 || 
|- style="text-align:center; background:#fbb;"
| 157 || September 28 || @ Angels || 2–4 || Haren (11–12) || Braden (10–14) || Rodney (14) || 43,163 || 77–80 || 
|- style="text-align:center; background:#fbb;"
| 158 || September 29 || @ Angels || 1–2 || Cassevah (1–2) || Ziegler (3–7) || || 39,199 || 77–81 || 
|- style="text-align:center; background:#bfb;"
| 159 || September 30 || @ Mariners || 8–1 || Gonzalez (15–9) || Fister (6–14) || || 16,940 || 78–81 || 
|- style="text-align:center; background:#bfb;"
| 160 || October 1 || @ Mariners || 9–0 || Cahill (18–8) || French (5–7) || || 19,656 || 79–81 || 
|- style="text-align:center; background:#bfb;"
| 161 || October 2 || @ Mariners || 5–3 || Anderson (7–6) || Pauley (4–9) || Breslow (4) || 17,717 || 80–81 || 
|- style="text-align:center; background:#bfb;"
| 162 || October 3 || @ Mariners || 4–3 || Braden (11–14) || Varvaro (0–1) || Breslow (5) || 23,263 || 81–81 || 
|-

Dallas Braden's Perfect Game 

On Mother's Day, Braden pitches the 19th perfect game in major league history against the MLB best team, the Tampa Bay Rays, who for the second time in less than a year were on the wrong side. The Rays less than two weeks before had hit Braden up for four runs on eight hits over just four innings. May 9 was the second perfect game in the Athletics' Oakland tenure, coming 42 years and 1 day after Catfish Hunter's game and first no-hitter by an Athletics pitcher since Dave Stewart's on June 29, . Braden's batterymate was Landon Powell, who was drafted the same year as Braden and had caught him in all levels of pro ball. In the top of fifth, Evan Longoria broke an unwritten rule by attempting to break up the perfect game with a bunt, but rolled foul and ended up striking out. All 12,228 fans weren't too thrilled to see Tampa's best hitter try to lay down a bunt, as Manager Joe Maddon said, "to get things going." Powell said that he started getting nervous around the sixth inning and was more excited about going back to behind the plate than hitting. He finished throwing 109 pitches with six strikeouts, which is tied for third fewest.

Month Review

September/October 
On September 1, Rajai Davis stole his 40th base for the season, becoming the fourth Athletic to have 2 seasons with +40 SB (Henderson, Campaneris, North). Also, Barton walks twice and is the first player in franchise history to have five consecutive multi-walk games. September 6, Pennington steals 23rd base, most for an Athletic infielder since Carney Lansford in 1989 and Crisp hits team's first leadoff home run of the season. September 8, team has 2 double-steals in one inning, first time since July 17, 1983. September 10, Crisp steals 3 bases in one game. September 9 and 10, team steals 4 bases in consecutive games for first time since July 30 and 31, 1993. September 13, Cust hits 100th career HR and 30-year-old Bobby Cramer earns first career win throwing 5.1 innings (1 ER, 4 H, 4 K), becoming the oldest starting pitcher in franchise history to earn a win in first major league game. September 14, Sogard gets first career hit in eight inning. September 21, Carter gets first career hit in sixth inning, snapping 0–33 streak. September 23, Braden and Ziegler threw a combined one-hitter, fourth time in Oakland's history the team has throw a no-hitter and one-hitter in same season. September 26, Tolleson hits first career home run. September 27, Ellis hits career 191st double, tying Miguel Tejada for 10th on Oakland's all-time list. September 28, Braden records career-high eighth pickoff of the season (previous high seven in 2008, 17th of his career).

The team stole 156 bases, the most for Oakland since .

August 
July 31 – August 2, Braden (W)-Gonzalez (L)-Cahill (W) toss 3 straight complete games. First time since September 8–10, 2000 (Heredia–Hudson–Zito). August 7, Davis steal 2 bases, giving him 100 as an Athletic, 10th player to do so in franchise history. August 9, Team's number a prospect, Chris Carter, makes MLB debut. August 11, Braden throws fourth complete game of the season, most since Mark Mulder threw five in 2004. August 18–20, Pennington drives in 3 consecutive GW runs. August 19, Cahill ties Nolan Ryan's record of 20 consecutive games with 6 or fewer hits allowed and Blevins records first career save. August 20, Crisp and Pennington double steal, giving them each 20 SBs on the season. First time since 1992 (Henderson–Wilson–Blankenship), the A's have 3 players with +20 SBs. Through August 20, Team has AL-best 3.53 ERA (5th in MLB). August 22, team promotion Fiesta Day, team wore 'Atléticos' jerseys. Ending August 27, team set franchise record of 18 consecutive games with 6 IP and 3 of less ER by starting pitchers. Also, 24 consecutive games allowing 5 runs or fewer, second longest AL streak in DH era since 1974 (1980 Royals with 25). Finished month as the only AL team to have three pitchers in top 10 ERA: Cahill (3rd), Gonzalez (9th), Braden (10th).

July 
July 2, with bases loaded and 2 outs, team records a 9–3 putout. Sweeney throws out Cleveland's Mike Redmond before reaching first for sixth time since . Team shutouts Cleveland 3–0. July 10–18, season-high 5-game winning streak. July 19, Sweeney out for season. Kouzmanoff hits walk-off single in bottom 10th on July 20, beating Boston 5–4.

June 
Bad month for the team, going 10–17. June 25–27, completed third sweep of season against Pittsburgh. Former Athletic Bobby Crosby makes first return to Oakland. June 30, Ellis steals home against Baltimore (First since ), but then ruling is changed to fielder's choice. Team is appealing the call.

May 
May 1, Donaldson gets first career hit, 2-run HR. May 4, Sweeney knocks in career-high 5 RBIs. May 12–16, 5-game losing streak, scoring total of 5 runs. Last time that happen was September . May 18, Suzuki hits walk-off single to right against Seattle (3rd time in season) in bottom 12. Completed first sweep of season (2-game series). May 21, Former Athletics Barry Zito now 0–4 with 8.85 ERA against team. May 21–23, completed second sweep of season against San Francisco, outscoring the cross bay rivals 10–1.

April 
Team lost season opener. April 6, Ellis hit a walk-off single to right against Seattle in bottom of the 10th. The next night, Suzuki hit a walk-off single to left against Seattle in bottom of the 9th. Ross made MLB debut (2.1 IP). April 12, team records first shutout, defeating Seattle 4–0. Duchscherer gets first win since July 8, . April 17, Sweeney hits walk off 2-run single to right against Baltimore. June 22, team hits into first triple-play since May 14, against New York. Team wore green jerseys at home for first time in 3 seasons. June 30, Donaldson makes MLB debut (0–1, 1 K).

Record vs. opponents

Team Leaders/Team Rank 
As of 10/3/10

 Barton lead AL in walks with 110 (2nd in MLB) and 1B FPct. with .993 (5th in MLB).
 Team ERA lead AL by 0.22. Rotation's 3.47 ERA lead MLB.

Roster

Player stats

Batting
Note: G = Games played; AB = At bats; R = Runs; H = Hits; 2B = Doubles; 3B = Triples; HR = Home runs; RBI = Runs batted in; SB = Stolen bases; BB = Walks; AVG = Batting average; SLG = Slugging average

Source:

Pitching
Note: W = Wins; L = Losses; ERA = Earned run average; G = Games pitched; GS = Games started; SV = Saves; IP = Innings pitched; H = Hits allowed; R = Runs allowed; ER = Earned runs allowed; BB = Walks allowed; SO = Strikeouts

Source:

Awards 
ALL STAR GAME
 Trevor Cahill, 1st selection – Did not pitch
 Andrew Bailey, 2nd selection – 0.1 IP, 1 K, 1 BB
PLAYER OF THE WEEK
 Dallas Braden (Perfect game on Mother's Day), May 3 – 9
 Trevor Cahill (2–0, 0.00 ERA, 17 IP), August 2 – 8

Opening Day lineup

Transactions 
Non-injury report
 09/13/10 – Recalled P Vin Mazzaro (3), C Josh Donaldson (2), 1B/OF Chris Carter (2). Selected contract and recalled IF Eric Sogard (1). DFA'd P Jeff Lyman (released 9/14).
 09/12/10 – Signed IF Aki Iwamura to a major league contract and transferred OF Conor Jackson to 60-Day DL.
 09/10/10 – Selected contract and recalled P Bobby Cramer (1), transferred IF Adam Rosales to 60-Day DL.
 09/07/10 – Selected contract and recalled OF Jeremy Hermida (1).
 09/06/10 – Optioned P Vin Mazzaro.
 09/03/10 – Signed OF Jeremy Hermida to a minor-league contract and assigned to AAA.
 09/01/10 – Outrighted P Cedrick Bowers to AAA and selected contract and recalled P Justin James (1). Recalled P Ross Wolf (2).
 08/31/10 – Signed IF Tommy Everidge to minor-league contract and assigned to AAA. Appeared in 24 games for the Athletics in 2009.
 08/26/10 – Outrighted OF Matt Watson to AAA.
 08/24/10 – Optioned OF Travis Buck and recalled OF Matt Carson (4).
 08/22/10 – Optioned P Ross Wolf.
 08/20/10 – Recalled 1B Jeff Larish (2).
 08/16/10 – Optioned 1B/OF Chris Carter and 1B Jeff Larish and recalled OF Travis Buck (1).
 08/13/10 – Recalled IF Steven Tolleson (2).
 08/09/10 – Optioned OF Matt Carson and recalled 1B/OF Chris Carter (1) and 1B Jeff Larish (1).
 08/03/10 – Claimed 1B Jeff Larish off waivers from DET and optioned to AAA. DFA'd 3B Adam Heether (outrighted 08/05).
 07/31/10 – Optioned P Cedrick Bowers and selected contract and recalled P Boof Bonser (1).
 07/30/10 – Optioned OF Travis Buck to AAA.
 07/24/10 – Recalled P Cedrick Bowers (3).
 07/20/10 – Optioned P Cedrick Bowers.
 07/19/10 – Recalled P Henry Rodriguez (4).
 07/14/10 – Released P Jamey Wright.
 07/07/10 – Optioned P Tyson Ross and selected contract and recalled up P Ross Wolf (1), transferred IF Eric Chavez to 60-Day DL.
 07/05/10 – Optioned P Clayton Mortensen and recalled OF Matt Carson (3). Selected contract & recalled up OF Matt Watson (1).
 07/02/10 – Signed P Boof Bonser to minor league contract. Claimed P Jeff Lyman off waivers from ATL and optioned to AA. Recalled P Clayton Mortensen (1).
 06/27/10 – Traded UT Eric Patterson to BOS for minor-league P Fabian Williamson.
 06/22/10 – DFA'd UT Eric Patterson. Traded UT Jake Fox to BAL for cash considerations and minor-league P Ross Wolf.
 06/16/10 – Signed P Jamey Wright to minor league contract, assigned to AAA.
 06/15/10 – Traded P Sam Demel (AAA) to ARI for cash considerations and LF/1B Conor Jackson and optioned OF Matt Carson.
 06/13/10 – DFA'd UT Jake Fox and recalled C Landon Powell (3).
 06/08/10 – Optioned P Henry Rodriguez and recalled OF Matt Carson (2).
 06/04/10 – Optioned C Landon Powell and recalled Ps Cedrick Bowers (2) and Henry Rodriguez (3).
 06/03/10 – Claimed 3B Adam Heether off waivers from MIL & optioned to AAA and transferred P Justin Duchscherer to 60-Day DL.
 05/27/10 – Recalled C Landon Powell (2).
 05/21/10 – Optioned C Landon Powell.
 05/20/10 – Recalled P Vin Mazzaro (2) and optioned P Henry Rodriguez.
 05/16/10 – Recalled P Henry Rodriguez (2). Optioned C Josh Donaldson. Selected contract and recalled up P Cedrick Bowers (1). DFA'd Chad Gaudin.
 05/15/10 – Selected contract and recalled DH Jack Cust (1). Optioned P Henry Rodriguez and DFA'd P Edwar Ramírez.
 05/07/10 – P Edwar Ramírez recalled (1).
 05/05/10 – Optioned P Vin Mazzaro and recalled P Henry Rodríguez (1).
 05/04/10 – Optioned IF Steven Tolleson and recalled P Vin Mazzaro (1).
 05/03/10 – Activated P Michael Wuertz and optioned P Brad Kilby.
 04/30/10 – Recalled P Trevor Cahill (1). Transferred P Joey Devine to 60-Day DL and selected contract and recalled up C Josh Donaldson (1).
 04/27/10 – Optioned P Edwar Ramírez and recalled C Landon Powell (1) and IF Steven Tolleson (1).
 04/26/10 – OF Jai Miller claimed off waivers by KC.
 04/23/10 – Optioned C Landon Powell and recalled P Brad Kilby (1).
 04/22/10 – DFA'd OF Jai Miller. Selected contract & recalled OF Matt Carson (1).
 04/20/10 – Optioned P Trevor Cahill to AAA.
 04/08/10 – Claimed OF Jai Miller off waivers from FLA, optioned to AAA.
 04/03/10 – DH Jack Cust DFA'd, (04/07) outrighted to AAA. P Tyson Ross added to 40-man roster.
 03/24/10 – Traded IF Gregorio Petit to TEX for P Edwar Ramírez.
 03/15/10 – Rule 5 draftee, Bobby Cassevah, returned to LAA.
 02/28/10 – Signed Ps Jason Jennings and Brett Tomko minor-league contracts. Jennings received major-league invite. Tomko still rehabbing.
 02/09/10 – Release OF Willy Taveras.
 02/06/10 – P Dana Eveland traded to TOR.
 02/01/10 – Signed free agent OF Gabe Gross. Claimed IF Steven Tolleson off waivers from the MIN. Traded IF Aaron Miles to CIN for IF Adam Rosales and OF Willy Taveras. DFA'd Dana Eveland, Willy Taveras, Gregorio Petit (outrighted to AAA).
 01/25/10 – Signed free agent RHP Ben Sheets to 1-year deal.
 01/22/10 – OF Grant Desme retires.
 01/15/10 – Traded OF Scott Hairston and OF Aaron Cunningham to SDP for 3B Kevin Kouzmanoff and IF Eric Sogard.
 01/15/10 – IF Tommy Everidge claimed off waivers by SEA.
 01/08/10 – P Jay Marshall claimed off waivers by NYM. MLB voided claim on 03/09 and returned to Oakland and released 03/10.

Farm System

Non Roster Invitees 
P Cedrick Bowers,
P Sam Demel (traded to ARI),
P Lenny DiNardo,
P Fernando Hernández,
P Marcus McBeth,
P Tyson Ross,
P Matt Wright,
C Josh Donaldson,
C Joel Galarraga,
C Anthony Recker,
C Max Stassi,
IF Adrian Cardenas,
IF Grant Green,
IF Dallas McPherson,
IF Gregorio Petit (traded to TEX),
IF Eric Sogard,
IF Jemile Weeks,
IF Matthew Whitney,
OF Corey Brown,
OF Matt Carson,
OF Michael Taylor,
OF Corey Wimberly

Bold made appearance with Oakland.

Minor League Standings 

x Made playoffs.
 Midland RockHounds went 35–35 (3rd) in first half of the season. Won South Division Finals 3–1. Lost in Texas League Championship Series.
 Stockton Ports went 31–39 (4th) in first half of the season. Lost in first-round of the playoffs.
 Kane County Cougars went 32–37 (6th) in first half of the season. Lost in first-round of playoffs.
 Vancouver Canadians went 17–21 (4th) in first half of the season. Lost in first-round of playoffs.

Affiliation news 
Prior to the  season, Oakland's farm system was ranked fifth in the league. For the first time since 2005, Oakland will have new minor league teams, for the  season. 2010 will be the last season for Oakland's affiliation with Kane County (MWL) and Vancouver (NWL). Kane County, Oakland's Low-A team since 2003, signed on with Kansas City for the next two years. Vancouver, a Triple-A affiliate for the 1999 season and a Short-Season A team since 2000, signed on with Toronto for the next four seasons. Oakland signed two-year deals with the Midwest League's Burlington Bees (Athletics' affiliate from 1963 to 1974, MWL title in 1965) and New York–Penn League's Vermont Lake Monsters.

Oakland agreed to a four-year extension with Triple-A Sacramento through the 2014 season. Sacramento has been Oakland's Triple-A team since 2000.

Top Prospects 

 Bold on 40-Man Roster to begin 2010 season.
 According to Baseball America

Organization leaders

Awards 
ALL STAR SELECTION
Pacific Coast League (AAA), July 14, 2010 @ Coca-Cola Park, Allentown, Pennsylvania
PCL vs. International League, 1–2
 Josh Donaldson – 0–1, 1 K
 Clayton Mortensen – 1.0 IP

Postseason All-Star Selection – Chris Carter

Texas League-South (AA), June 30, 2010 @ Citibank Ballpark, Midland, Texas
North vs. South, 4–5
 Jeff Bailey – Replaced Corpus Christi's Germán Durán, 0–1, 1K
 Travis Banwart – Promoted to AAA
 Corey Brown – 0–1, 1 K
 Archie Gilbert – 0–1, 1 R, 1 RBI, 1 BB, 1 K
 Carlos Hernández – 1.1 IP, 3 H, 1 ER, 2 K
 Josh Horton – 1–1
 Jared Lansford – Replaced Midland teammate Travis Banwart, 0.1 IP, 3 H
 Alex Valdez – 1–2, 1 R, 1 K
 Beau Vaughan – Promoted to AAA

Postseason All-Star Selection – Corey Brown, Josh Horton

California League (A), June 22, 2010 @ BB&T Coastal Field, Myrtle Beach, South Carolina
CAL vs. Carolina League, 4–3
 Stephen Parker – 1–2, GW RBI single in 9th

Postseason All-Star Selection – Grant Green, Shawn Haviland, Stephen Parker

Midwest League-West (A), June 22, 2010 @ Parkview Field, Fort Wayne, Indiana
West vs. East, 2–6
 Ian Krol – 0.2 IP, 4 H, 2 R, 1 K
 Connor Hoehn – 0.1 IP, 1 K
 Max Stassi – 1–2

ALL STAR FUTURES GAME July 11, 2010 @ Angel Stadium, Anaheim, California
U.S. vs. World, 9–1
 Grant Green, Stockton (A), U.S. Team – 1–2, 1 RBI

PLAYER OF THE WEEK
Sacramento River Cats
 Bobby Cramer, August 16 – 22
 Kyle Middleton, June 21 – 27
Midland RockHounds
 Archie Gilbert, April 26 – May 2
Stockton Ports
 Grant Green, August 16 – 22
 Shawn Haviland, July 26 – August 2, August 16 – 22
 Jermaine Mitchell, August 2 – 8
 Stephen Parker, April 26 – May 2
Vancouver Canadians
 A.J. Kirby-Jones, July 26 – August 2, August 30 – September 5
 Ryan Doolittle, June 28 – July 4
 Deyvi Jimenez, July 5 – 11
 Matthew Thomson, July 12 – 18, August 2 – 8, August 23 – 29
 Tony Thompson, July 5 – 11

Top 10 Draft Picks 

 Cabrera appeared in the 2009 Under Armour All-America Game.

International signings 
 Yadel Martí, RHP, Cuba
 Anderson Mata, LHP, Venezuela
 Renato Nunez, 3B, Venezuela
 Argenis Raga, C, Venezuela
 Jesus Rivas, IF/OF, Venezuela
 José Torres, LHP, Venezuela

Arizona Fall League 
Seven player from the organization were assigned to the Phoenix Desert Dogs managed by Dodger's hitting coach Don Mattingly. The pitching coach will be the Athletics' roving pitching coach and rehab coordinator Garvin Alston.
 Travis Banwart, P
 Michael Benacka, P
 Grant Green, INF
 Carlos Hernández, P
 Justin James, P
 Stephen Parker, INF
 Lance Sewell, P
 Michael Taylor, OF

Notes

References 

 2010 Oakland Athletics season at Baseball Reference
 2010 Oakland Athletics season Official Site

Oakland Athletics seasons
Oakland Athletics
2010s in Oakland, California
Oak